Chilena is a genus of moths native to South Asia.

Chilena may also refer to:

Chilena (musical genre), a Mexican folk genre
Bicycle kick, an association football strike known as chilena in some Spanish-speaking countries

See also